Band of Thieves is a 1962 British musical film directed by Peter Bezencenet and starring Acker Bilk, Geoffrey Sumner and Jennifer Jayne. It was produced as a second feature in an attempt to cash in on the Trad jazz craze. It was shot at Pinewood Studios.

Cast
 Acker Bilk as 	Self 
 Colin Smith as 	Flash
 Jonathan Mortimer as Fingers
 Ronald McKay as	Scouse 
 Roy James as 	Dippy
 Stan Greig as 	Haggis
 Ernest Price as The Mole 
 Geoffrey Sumner as 	The Governor
 Jimmy Thompson as	Dandy
 Jennifer Jayne as	Anne
 Maudie Edwards as The Duchess
 Charmian Innes as 	Mrs. Van Der Ness
 Arthur Mullard as Getaway
 Michael Peake as 	Chief Warder
 Totti Truman Taylor as Woman
 Marianne Stone as Cleaner
 Eleanor McCready as 	Girl
 Norrie Paramor as 	Self - Recording Engineer
 Peter Haigh as Self - Newsreader
 Acker Bilk's Paramount Jazz Band as Themselves 
 Carol Deene as 	Self - Singer

References

Bibliography
 Chibnall, Steve & McFarlane, Brian. The British 'B' Film. Palgrave MacMillan, 2009.

External links
 

1962 films
1962 musical films
British musical films
Films shot at Pinewood Studios
1960s English-language films
Films directed by Peter Bezencenet
1960s British films